Jack (died 1890) was a chacma baboon who attained some fame for acting as an assistant to a disabled railway signalman in South Africa.

History 

Jack was the pet and assistant of double leg amputee signalman James Wide, who worked for the Cape Town–Port Elizabeth Railway service. James "Jumper" Wide had been known for jumping between railcars until an accident where he fell and lost both of his legs. To assist in performing his duties, Wide purchased the baboon named Jack in 1881, and trained him to push his wheelchair and to operate the railways signals under supervision.

An official investigation was initiated after a concerned member of the public reported that a baboon was observed changing railway signals at Uitenhage near Port Elizabeth.

After initial skepticism, the railway decided to officially employ Jack once his job competency was verified. The baboon was paid twenty cents a day, and half a bottle of beer each week. It is widely reported that in his nine years of employment with the railway company, Jack never made a single mistake.

After nine years of duty, Jack died of tuberculosis in 1890. Jack's skull is in the collection of the Albany Museum in Grahamstown.

See also
 List of individual monkeys

References

Sources

External links
 Jack the Signalman by Pieter du Plessis

Service animal
Individual baboons
History of Port Elizabeth
1890 animal deaths
Individual animals in South Africa
19th century in South Africa
Amputations
Rail transport in South Africa
History of rail transport in South Africa
Railway accidents and incidents in South Africa
Railway signalling